Big Snow Lake is a freshwater lake located on the northern slope of Big Snow Mountain, west of Dutch Miller Gap, in King County, Washington. Big Snow Lake shares the ridge with Snowflake Lake and is a short distance from Myrtle Lake, to the West, Fools Gold Lake over its northern slope and Little Bulger Ridge further off the northwest shore of Myrtle Lake.

See also 
 List of lakes of the Alpine Lakes Wilderness

References 

Lakes of King County, Washington
Lakes of the Alpine Lakes Wilderness
Okanogan National Forest